Jeffersonian refers to several fields upon which the U.S. President Thomas Jefferson had an impact:

Jeffersonian architecture
Jeffersonian democracy
Jeffersonian Bible
The Democratic-Republican Party were called Jeffersonians, among many other things

In fiction:
The Jeffersonian Institute, a fictional research institution in the US television program Bones, based on the real Smithsonian Institution

In transportation:
The Jeffersonian, a train operated by the Pennsylvania Railroad